José María Avizanda Glaría (born 24 May 1966), better known as Flaco, is a Spanish football coach and former player. He won the Norwegian Football Cup with Molde in 1994. Flaco has played for Rayo Vallecano from 1986 to 1990, where he was a teammate of Jan Berg. When he left Rayo Vallecano for Molde, he became the first and for many years the only Spaniard to have played in the Norwegian Premier League. During his coaching career he has coached Averøykameratene and Bryn from Møre og Romsdal. After 17 years in Norway, he now lives in Spain.

Career statistics

Notes

References

External links
 
 
 

1966 births
Living people
Spanish footballers
Molde FK players
Rayo Vallecano players
Association football defenders
Spanish expatriate footballers
Spanish expatriate sportspeople in Norway
Expatriate footballers in Norway
Spanish football managers
La Liga players
Segunda División players
Eliteserien players
Norwegian First Division players
Sportspeople from Pamplona